"The Replacements" is the third episode of the third season of the anthology television series American Horror Story, which premiered on October 23, 2013, on the cable network FX. This episode is rated TV-MA (LSV).

This episode focuses on Fiona (Jessica Lange) taking on Madison as a protégé (Emma Roberts) and Zoe (Taissa Farmiga) tries to give Kyle (Evan Peters) his life back. Angela Bassett, Gabourey Sidibe, and Patti LuPone guest star as Marie Laveau, Queenie, and Joan Ramsey, respectively.

Plot
Madison and Nan take a liking to the new next door neighbor, Luke Ramsey, but have problems with his overly-religious mother Joan. After an encounter with the Ramseys, Madison develops the power of Pyrokinesis. 

A weakened Fiona learns she has terminal cancer and believes it to be caused by one of the students rising to take her place as the Supreme. After hearing of Madison's growing power, Fiona takes her under wing. She shows Madison what it means to be a real witch, and gets her to reveal another new power she possesses. Realizing she is the next Supreme, Fiona plans to get rid of her. 

Zoe visits Kyle's distraught mother and takes him home, not knowing of her true colors. She sexually abuses him. 

Cordelia is told by her doctor that she can never have a baby and goes to Marie Laveau for help. 

As punishment for her crimes of torture and abuse of slaves in 1830, Delphine LaLaurie is forced by Fiona to be a maid to the students, causing tension between her and Queenie.

Reception
"The Replacements" received a 2.1 18–49 ratings share and was watched by 3.78 million viewers.

"The Replacements" received critical acclaim. Rotten Tomatoes reports a 100% approval rating, based on 14 reviews. The critical consensus reads, ""The Replacements" focuses on the weird and the wonderful as it tackles taboos and a shocking death." At Vulture, Rakesh Satyal praised Angela Bassett for "straight-up killing it" and offered praise for the comedic subplot involving LaLaurie. Stating that the episode "upped the ante", he awarded it a full five out of five stars. Emily VanDerWerff of The A.V. Club gave the episode a B rating for "The Replacements". Matt Fowler from IGN gave the episode an 8/10 rating, calling it a great episode and Madison's "shocking" death "the best thing Coven done so far". He did however say, "I don't mind things that are batshit nuts. Not at all. But I'm also not going to emotionally invest in those things as much as I will more centralized themes."

References

External links

 

2013 American television episodes
American Horror Story: Coven episodes
Fiction set in 1971
Incest in television
Matricide in fiction